Henry Burke (died 1827) was the owner of the Silver Mount estate in Portland Parish, Jamaica. He was elected to the House of Assembly of Jamaica in 1820. A monument to him exists in Christ Church, Port Antonio.

References

External links 
https://www.ancestry.com/boards/thread.aspx?mv=flat&m=4901&p=surnames.burke
http://www.jamaicanfamilysearch.com/Members/BurkeandDunn.htm

1827 deaths
Year of birth missing
Jamaican landowners
Members of the House of Assembly of Jamaica